In biology, an organ is a collection of tissues joined in a structural unit to serve a common function. In the hierarchy of life, an organ lies between tissue and an organ system. Tissues are formed from same type cells to act together in a function. Tissues of different types combine to form an organ which has a specific function. The intestinal wall for example is formed by epithelial tissue and smooth muscle tissue. Two or more organs working together in the execution of a specific body function form an organ system, also called a biological system or body system.

An organ's tissues can be broadly categorized as parenchyma, the functional tissue, and stroma, the structural tissue with supportive, connective, or ancillary functions. For example, the gland's tissue that makes the hormones is the parenchyma, whereas the stroma includes the nerves that innervate the parenchyma, the blood vessels that oxygenate and nourish it and carry away its metabolic wastes, and the connective tissues that provide a suitable place for it to be situated and anchored. The main tissues that make up an organ tend to have common embryologic origins, such as arising from the same germ layer. Organs exist in most multicellular organisms. In single-celled organisms such as bacteria, the functional analogue of an organ is known as an organelle. In plants, there are three main organs.

In the study of anatomy, viscera (singular viscus) refers to the internal organs of the abdominal, thoracic, and pelvic cavities. The abdominal organs may be classified as solid organs, or hollow organs. The solid organs are the liver, pancreas, spleen, kidneys, and adrenal glands. The hollow organs of the abdomen are the stomach, intestines, gallbladder, bladder, and rectum. In the thoracic cavity the heart is a hollow, muscular organ.

The number of organs in any organism depends on the definition used. By one widely adopted definition, 79 organs have been identified in the human body.

Animals

Except for placozoans, multicellular animals including humans have a variety of organ systems. These specific systems are widely studied in human anatomy. The functions of these organ systems often share significant overlap. For instance, the nervous and endocrine system both operate via a shared organ, the hypothalamus. For this reason, the two systems are combined and studied as the neuroendocrine system. The same is true for the musculoskeletal system because of the relationship between the muscular and skeletal systems.
 Cardiovascular system: pumping and channeling blood to and from the body and lungs with heart, blood and blood vessels.
 Digestive system: digestion and processing food with salivary glands, esophagus, stomach, liver, gallbladder, pancreas, intestines, colon, mesentery, rectum and anus.
 Endocrine system: communication within the body using hormones made by endocrine glands such as the hypothalamus, pituitary gland, pineal body or pineal gland, thyroid, parathyroids and adrenals, i.e., adrenal glands.
 Excretory system: kidneys, ureters, bladder and urethra involved in fluid balance, electrolyte balance and excretion of urine.
 Lymphatic system: structures involved in the transfer of lymph between tissues and the blood stream, the lymph and the nodes and vessels that transport it including the immune system: defending against disease-causing agents with leukocytes, tonsils, adenoids, thymus and spleen.
 Integumentary system: skin, hair and nails of mammals. Also scales of fish, reptiles, and birds, and feathers of birds.
 Muscular system: movement with muscles.
 Nervous system: collecting, transferring and processing information with brain, spinal cord and nerves.
 Reproductive system: the sex organs, such as ovaries, fallopian tubes, uterus, vulva, vagina, testes, vas deferens, seminal vesicles, prostate and penis.
 Respiratory system: the organs used for breathing, the pharynx, larynx, trachea, bronchi, lungs and diaphragm.
 Skeletal system: structural support and protection with bones, cartilage, ligaments and tendons.

Viscera
In the study of anatomy, viscera (singular viscus) refers to the internal organs of the abdominal, thoracic, and pelvic cavities. The abdominal organs may be classed as solid organs, or hollow organs. The solid organs include the liver, pancreas, spleen, kidneys, and adrenal glands. The hollow organs include the stomach, intestines, gallbladder, bladder, and rectum. In the thoracic cavity the heart is a hollow, muscular organ. Splanchnology is the study of the viscera. The term "visceral" is contrasted with the term "", meaning "of or relating to the wall of a body part, organ or cavity" The two terms are often used in describing a membrane or piece of connective tissue, referring to the opposing sides.

Origin and evolution

The organ level of organisation in animals can be first detected in flatworms and the more derived phyla, i.e. the bilaterians. The less-advanced taxa (i.e. Placozoa, Porifera, Ctenophora and Cnidaria) do not show consolidation of their tissues into organs.

More complex animals are composed of different organs, which have evolved over time. For example, the liver and heart evolved in the chordates about 550-500 million years ago, while the gut and brain are even more ancient, arising in the ancestor of vertebrates, insects, molluscs, and worms about 700-650 million years ago.

Given the ancient origin of most vertebrate organs, researchers have looked for model systems, where organs have evolved more recently, and ideally have evolved multiple times independently. An outstanding model for this kind of research is the placenta, which has evolved more than 100 times independently in vertebrates, has evolved relatively recently in some lineages, and exists in intermediate forms in extant taxa. Studies on the evolution of the placenta have identified a variety of genetic and physiological processes that contribute to the origin and evolution of organs, these include the re-purposing of existing animal tissues, the acquisition of new functional properties by these tissues, and novel interactions of distinct tissue types.

Plants  

The study of plant organs is covered in plant morphology. Organs of plants can be divided into vegetative and reproductive. Vegetative plant organs include roots, stems, and leaves. The reproductive organs are variable. In flowering plants, they are represented by the flower, seed and fruit. In conifers, the organ that bears the reproductive structures is called a cone. In other divisions (phyla) of plants, the reproductive organs are called strobili, in Lycopodiophyta, or simply gametophores in mosses. Common organ system designations in plants include the differentiation of shoot and root. All parts of the plant above ground (in non-epiphytes), including the functionally distinct leaf and flower organs, may be classified together as the shoot organ system.

The vegetative organs are essential for maintaining the life of a plant. While there can be 11 organ systems in animals, there are far fewer in plants, where some perform the vital functions, such as photosynthesis, while the reproductive organs are essential in reproduction. However, if there is asexual vegetative reproduction, the vegetative organs are those that create the new generation of plants (see clonal colony).

Society and culture
Many societies have a system for organ donation, in which a living or deceased donor's organ are transplanted into a person with a failing organ. The transplantation of larger solid organs often requires immunosuppression to prevent organ rejection or graft-versus-host disease.

There is considerable interest throughout the world in creating laboratory-grown or artificial organs.

Organ transplants
Beginning in the 20th century organ transplants began to take place as scientists knew more about the anatomy of organs. These came later in time as procedures were often dangerous and difficult. Both the source and method of obtaining the organ to transplant are major ethical issues to consider, and because organs as resources for transplant are always more limited than demand for them, various notions of justice, including distributive justice, are developed in the ethical analysis. This situation continues as long as transplantation relies upon organ donors rather than technological innovation, testing, and industrial manufacturing.

History

The English word "organ" dates back to the twelfth century and refers to any musical instrument. By the late 14th century, the musical term's meaning had narrowed to refer specifically to the keyboard-based instrument. At the same time, a second meaning arose, in reference to a "body part adapted to a certain function".

Plant organs are made from tissue composed of different types of tissue. The three tissue types are ground, vascular, and dermal. When three or more organs are present, it is called an organ system.

The adjective visceral, also splanchnic, is used for anything pertaining to the internal organs. Historically, viscera of animals were examined by Roman pagan priests like the haruspices or the augurs in order to divine the future by their shape, dimensions or other factors. This practice remains an important ritual in some remote, tribal societies.

The term "visceral" is contrasted with the term "", meaning "of or relating to the wall of a body part, organ or cavity" The two terms are often used in describing a membrane or piece of connective tissue, referring to the opposing sides.

Antiquity
Aristotle used the word frequently in his philosophy, both to describe the organs of plants or animals (e.g. the roots of a tree, the heart or liver of an animal), and to describe more abstract "parts" of an interconnected whole (e.g. his logical works, taken as a whole, are referred to as the Organon).

Some alchemists (e.g. Paracelsus) adopted the Hermetic Qabalah assignment between the seven vital organs and the seven classical planets as follows:

See also
 Organoid
 Organ-on-a-chip

References

External links
 

Levels of organization (Biology)